Brian Saunders may refer to:

 Brian Saunders (sprinter) (born 1952), Canadian sprinter
 Brian Saunders (sound engineer), American sound engineer
 Brian Saunders (weightlifter), English weightlifter

See also 
 Bryan Lewis Saunders (born 1969), performance artist, videographer, and performance poet